Clarke Fischer (March 30, 1900 – October 21, 1979) was a player in the National Football League.

Biography
Fischer was born Clarke John Fischer on March 30, 1900 in Hermansville, Michigan. He attended high school in Milwaukee, Wisconsin. He died in Pana, Illinois on October 21, 1979.

Career
Fischer played with the Milwaukee Badgers during the 1926 NFL season as a halfback. Prior to the NFL, he played collegiately at The Catholic University of America and Marquette University.

See also
List of Milwaukee Badgers players

References

People from Menominee County, Michigan
Milwaukee Badgers players
Players of American football from Milwaukee
Catholic University Cardinals football players
Marquette Golden Avalanche football players
1900 births
1979 deaths